On 10 February 2023, three Israelis were killed and four more were injured when a Palestinian man rammed his car into a bus stop in Ramot, an Israeli settlement in East Jerusalem. The perpetrator was shot dead at the scene by a police officer. The fatalities included two children aged 6 and 8 and a 20-year-old man. Police confirmed the attack to have been an act of terrorism.

Perpetrator 
The attacker was identified as 31-year-old Palestinian citizen of Israel named Hussein Qaraqa, a resident of Isawiya. Social media (primarily Facebook) activity showed that Qaraqa had made statements in support of Palestinian militant groups such as Palestinian Islamic Jihad, Lions' Den. During the 2022 Gaza–Israel clashes he expressed his support for the PIJ. He regularly praised Palestinians who carried out attacks on Israelis, both soldiers and civilians.

Qaraqa had been released from a psychiatric hospital a few days prior to the attack. His uncle told Palestinian media that Qaraqa suffered from severe back pain. Israeli police arrested a Qaraqa's relative and his brother for expressing their intention to carry out similar attacks.

Reactions 
Hamas and Islamic Jihad both praised the attack as "heroic". The Al-Aqsa Martyrs' Brigades, the armed wing of the West Bank's governing Fatah party also welcomed the attack.

In response, the Israeli cabinet approved the legalization of nine settlement outposts deep in the West Bank. Israeli authorities announced 300 bus stops will be fortified to prevent future attacks, while the Jerusalem municipality will later fortify an additional 700 stops in areas where the need is deemed less urgent. In addition, the Knesset passed a law to revoke Israeli citizenship of convicted terrorists who receive payments from the Palestinian Authority.

US Secretary of State Antony Blinken, who had recently visited Israel, said, "The deliberate targeting of innocent civilians is repugnant and unconscionable. We stand firmly with Israel in the face of this attack."

The United Arab Emirates' Ministry of Foreign Affairs issued a statement on its website, conveying condolences to Israel, strongly condemning the "terrorist attack", and rejecting "all forms of violence and terrorism aimed at undermining security and stability in contravention of human values and principles." 

European Union Ambassador to Israel Dimiter Tzantchev tweeted his horror and sadness and stated that "the EU strongly and unequivocally condemns terrorism". UK Foreign Secretary James Cleverly and German Ambassador to Israel Steffen Seibert also issued public statements condemning the attack and extending their  condolences to the families of the victims.

US Special Coordinator for the Middle East Peace Process, Tor Wennesland, called on all concerned parties to avoid actions that would "aggravate the situation on the ground" and instead protect "the prospect of a political solution to the mounting security crises."

See also
Timeline of the Israeli–Palestinian conflict in 2023

References

2023 murders in Asia
February 2023 crimes in Asia
Terrorist incidents in Israel in 2023
Terrorist incidents in Jerusalem in the 2020s
Terrorist incidents involving vehicular attacks
East Jerusalem